Eladio Zárate (born 14 January 1942 in Alberdi, Paraguay) is a former Paraguayan footballer who played in clubs of Paraguay, Argentina and Chile and the Paraguay national football team in the Copa América 1963.

Teams
  Olimpia 1962–1963
  San Lorenzo 1964
  Huracán 1965
  Unión Española 1966–1969
  Universidad de Chile 1970–1973
  Guaraní 1974–1979

Honours
  Unión Española 1967 and 1969 (Top Scorer Chilean Championship)
  Universidad de Chile 1971 (Top Scorer Chilean Championship)

References

External links
 

1942 births
Living people
Paraguayan footballers
Paraguayan expatriate footballers
Paraguay international footballers
Club Olimpia footballers
Club Guaraní players
Club Atlético Huracán footballers
San Lorenzo de Almagro footballers
Unión Española footballers
Universidad de Chile footballers
Expatriate footballers in Chile
Expatriate footballers in Argentina
Association football forwards
Sportivo Ameliano managers